Menara Jakarta is an under construction mixed development complex at Kemayoran, Jakarta, Indonesia. Located in front of JIEXPO, it consists of six towers, 1 Conho (Condo & Hotel), 1 Condo Tower, 1 Office Tower, and 3 Suite Tower. The complex will also have a mall. The complex is constructed on the site of postponed Jakarta Tower.

The towers of this complex are named as Fortune Tower, Azure Tower, Celestial Tower, Breeze Tower, Equinox Tower, and Destiny Tower. 

The office tower in the complex is known as Fortune Tower, which will be a skyscraper of 280 meters tall at the tip. Once completed it will be one of the tallest buildings in Jakarta, with facilities such as Sky Garden, Sky Lounge & Restaurant and a 360' Sky Observatory.

See also
 List of tallest buildings in Jakarta
 List of tallest buildings in Indonesia

External links

References 

Buildings and structures in Jakarta
Skyscrapers in Indonesia
Post-independence architecture of Indonesia
Skyscraper office buildings in Indonesia
Residential skyscrapers in Indonesia